Bahuntilpung  is a Village lies in South-eastern Nepal, located in Sindhuli District of the Janakpur Zone . Among 11 wards of 
Tinpatan Rural Municipality it is ward no. 8. According to the 1991 Nepal census its population is 3,007.

References

External links
UN map of the municipalities of Sindhuli District

Populated places in Sindhuli District